The intrascleral plexus is the network of blood vessels within the substance of the sclera. Blood enters from the small connecting channels from Schlemm's canal; it exits through superficial vessels, then passing it on to the anterior ciliary veins.

References

Human anatomy